The Little Wind River  arises in the central Wind River Range in Wyoming and flows southeast through the towns of Fort Washakie and Ethete to its confluence with the Big Wind River near Riverton, Wyoming.

References

Bodies of water of Fremont County, Wyoming
Rivers of Wyoming